The Eurytomidae are a family within the superfamily Chalcidoidea.

Unlike most chalcidoids, the larvae of many are phytophagous (feeding in stems, seeds, or galls), while others are more typical parasitoids, though even then the hosts are usually found within plant tissues. They are found throughout the world in virtually all habitats, and a few are considered pests.

They tend to be dull and not metallic, and heavily punctured, with very thick, collar-like pronota.

Taxa

, Eurytomid genera include:

Buresiinae Lotfalizadeh et al, 2007
 Buresium 
 Macrorileya 

Eurytominae 
 Aiolomorphus 
 Aranedra 
 Austrodecatoma 
 Ausystole 
 Axanthosoma 
 Axanthosomella 
 Axima 
 Aximopsis 
 Banyoma 
 Bephrata 
 Bephratelloides 
 Bephratoides 
 Bruchodape 
 Bruchophagus 
 Burksoma 
 Camponotophilus 
 Cathilaria 
 Chryseida 
 Chryseurytoma 
 Endobia 
 Eudoxinna 
 Eurytoma 
 Eurytomocharis 
 Exeurytoma 
 Ficomila 
 Foutsia 
 Fronsoma 
 Gibsonoma 
 Giraultoma 
 Heimbrella 
 Hexeurytoma 
 Homodecatoma 
 Houstonia 
 Isosomodes 
 Kavayva 
 Khamul 
 Mangoma 
 Masneroma 
 Neobephrata 
 Parabruchophagus 
 Paradecatoma 
 Philippinoma 
 Philolema 
 Phleudecatoma 
 Phylloxeroxenus 
 Plutarchia 
 Prodecatoma 
 Prodecatomidea 
 Proseurytoma 
 Pseudotetramesa 
 Ramanuja 
 Ramdasoma 
 Risbecoma 
 Stigmeurytoma 
 Syceurytoma 
 Sycophila 
 Systole 
 Systolema 
 Tenuipetiolus 
 Tetramesa 
 Tetramesella 
 Townesoma 
 Zerovella 

Heimbrinae 
 Heimbra 
 Symbra 

Rileyinae 
 Austrophotismus 
 Boucekiana 
 Dougiola 
 Gatesina 
 Neorileya 
 Platyrileya 
 Rileya

References

External links
Universal Chalcidoidea Database
Cedar Creek Pinned specimen images.
Philolema latrodecti (Fullaway)     on the UF / IFAS Featured Creatures Web site
Bugguide.net. Family Eurytomidae

 
Apocrita families